Brutus is the central high-performance cluster of ETH Zurich. It was introduced to the public in May 2008. A new computing cluster called EULER has been announced and opened to the public in May 2014.

Processors 

Brutus is a heterogeneous system containing 11 different kinds of compute nodes:

Standard nodes
 120 nodes with four 12-core AMD Opteron 6174 CPUs and 64 GB of RAM (5760 cores)
 24 nodes with two 12-core AMD Opteron 6174 CPUs and 32 GB of RAM (576 cores)
 410 nodes with four quad-core AMD Opteron 8380 CPUs and 32 GB of RAM (6560 cores)
 80 nodes with four quad-core AMD Opteron 8384 CPUs and 32 GB of RAM (1280 cores)

Large-memory (fat) nodes
 6 nodes with four 8-core Intel Xeon E7-8837 CPUs and 1024 GB of RAM (192 cores) — NEW!
 80 nodes with four 12-core AMD Opteron 6174 CPUs and 256 GB of RAM (3840 cores) 10 nodes with four quad-core AMD Opteron 8380 CPUs and 128 GB of RAM (160 cores)GPU nodes
 18 nodes with two 12-core AMD Opteron 6174 CPUs, 32 GB of RAM and 2 Nvidia Fermi C2050 GPUs (432 cores + 36 GPUs) 2 nodes with two 6-core AMD Opteron 2435 CPUs, 32 GB of RAM and 6 Nvidia Tesla C1060 GPUs (24 cores + 12 GPUs) 2 nodes with two 6-core AMD Opteron 2435 CPUs, 32 GB of RAM and various Nvidia and AMD GPUs (24 cores + 2 GPUs)Legacy nodes
 256 nodes with two dual-core AMD Opteron 2220 CPUs and 16 GB of RAM (1024 cores)''

In total Brutus contains 19,872 cores, plus a few hundreds in the cluster's file servers, login nodes and management nodes.

The peak performance of Brutus is slightly over 200 teraflops (200 × 1012 floating-point operations per second).

Networking 

 All nodes are connected to the cluster's Gigabit Ethernet backbone
 All nodes (except those with Opteron 2220 CPUs) are connected to a high-speed InfiniBand QDR network

Applications 

Thanks to its heterogeneous nature, Brutus can tackle a wide range of applications:
 Serial and embarrassingly parallel computations
 Distributed-memory computations  (MPI using MVAPICH2)
 Shared-memory, multithreaded applications (OpenMP) up to 1024 GB of memory and/or 48 threads
 Third-party (commercial) applications

Trivia 

 Brutus was ranked the 88th fastest computer in the world in November 2009 (top500.org). Since then, its peak performance has increased three-fold (from 65 to 200 TF).
 It was then the most energy efficient general purpose supercomputer in the world (Heise.de)
 It successor, EULER, was ranked the 255th fastest computer in the world in June 2014

External links 

 Official Brutus page at ETH Zurich: http://www.cluster.ethz.ch/index_EN
 Picture gallery: http://www.gallery.ethz.ch/brutus
 Article in ETH Life, the on-line journal of ETH Zurich
 Brutus wiki: http://brutuswiki.ethz.ch (access restricted to members of ETH)

References 

Cluster computing
GPGPU supercomputers